Government College, Madappally (known as Madappally College) is an affiliated college to the University of Calicut, located on a green-clad hillock near Madappally, north of Vatakara town.

About college
This college has turned to be the hub of higher education in North Kerala. The college was established in 1958, which was then affiliated to the University of Kerala. Later college was shifted to a new building with new courses in 1963. In 1968, the college was separated from the University of Kerala and affiliated to the University of Calicut.

Courses
MA 
1. History	       
2. Political Science
3. English

MSc	 
1.  Physics	
2.  Chemistry	
3.  Zoology	

M.Com

BA
1. History with General Economics & Political Science (Sub)	60
2. English with Social and Cultural History of Britain  & World History    (Sub)	20
3. Economics with political science & Modern Indian History (Sub)	40
4. Politics with General Economics & World History(Sub)	40

BSc      
1. Physics with Maths & Chemistry  (Sub)	24
2. Chemistry with Maths & Physics (Sub)	24
3. Botany with Chemistry & Zoology (Sub)	24
4. Zoology with Chemistry & Botany  (Sub)	24
5. Mathematics with Statistics & Physics (sub)	20

BCom
1. With A II Finance	                        60

Notable alumni
 Mullappally Ramachandran
 Richard Hay
 Punathil Kunjabdulla
 Akbar Kakkattil
 Rajan Gurukkal
 Suveeran
 V. R. Sudheesh
 K. P. Satheesh Chandran
 V. T. Murali

See also
Education in India
Education in Kerala
Madappally, Vatakara
List of institutions of higher education in Kerala
List of colleges affiliated to the University of Calicut

References

External links
Government College, Madappally
University of Calicut
University Grants Commission
National Assessment and Accreditation Council

Colleges affiliated with the University of Calicut